The Parliamentary Under-Secretary of State for Americas and Caribbean is a ministerial office in the Foreign, Commonwealth and Development Office of the British government.

The office of Minister of State for Middle East and North Africa was held by James Cleverly MP from 13 February 2020 to 8 February 2022. In December 2021, the post adopted responsibility for North America and became the deputy to the Foreign Secretary.

The Middle East portfolio was merged into the Minister of State for Asia and the Middle East in February 2022, with Cleverly moving to the position of Minister of State for Europe and North America. The position of Minister of State for Europe and North America was split in July 2022, with Graham Stuart becoming Minister of State for Europe and Rehman Chishti assuming responsibility for North America as Parliamentary Under-Secretary of State for North America, Sanctions and Consular Policy.

Responsibilities 
The minister is responsible for the following:

 North America
 conflict, humanitarian issues, human security
 CHASE (Conflict, Humanitarian and Security Department)
 Stabilisation Unit
 defence and international security
 Organization for Security and Co-operation in Europe (OSCE) and Council of Europe
 Conflict, Stability and Security Fund (CSSF)
 safeguarding

List

See also 
Foreign and Commonwealth Office
Secretary of State for Foreign and Commonwealth Affairs
Minister of State for Europe
Minister of State for Foreign Affairs
Under-Secretary of State for Foreign Affairs
Minister for Africa

References 

Foreign, Commonwealth and Development Office
United Kingdom–Middle Eastern relations
Lists of government ministers of the United Kingdom
Foreign ministers of the United Kingdom